The 2007 Proximus Diamond Games was a women's professional tennis tournament played on indoor hard courts at the Sportpaleis in Antwerp, Belgium that was part of the Tier II category of the 2006 WTA Tour. It was the sixth edition of the tournament and was held from 10 February until 18 February 2002. First-seeded Amélie Mauresmo won her third consecutive singles title at the event and earned $88,265 first-prize money. Kim Clijsters made an emotional farewell in front of her home crowd' she retired two tournaments later.

Finals

Singles

 Amélie Mauresmo defeated  Kim Clijsters, 6–4, 7–6(7–4)

Doubles

 Cara Black /  Liezel Huber defeated  Elena Likhovtseva /  Elena Vesnina, 7–5, 4–6, 6–1

Qualifying singles

Seeds
The seeded players are listed below. Players in bold have qualified. The players no longer in the tournament are listed with the round in which they exited.

Draw

Draw key
 Q = Qualifier
 WC = Wild card
 Alt = Alternate
 LL = Lucky loser
 r = Retired

Group 1

Group 2

Group 3

Group 4

Notes
Qualifiers receive 15 ranking points.
Finalists receive $2,065 and 10 ranking points.
The last direct acceptance was Joanna Sakowicz.
The Players' Representatives were Anastasiya Yakimova and Eva Birnerová.

See also
2007 WTA Tour

External links
 ITF tournament edition details
 Tournament draws

2007 WTA Tour
2007 in Belgian tennis
2007 Proximus Diamond Games